Ian Reid may refer to:
 Ian Reid (skateboarder) (born 1977)

 Ian Reid (Alberta politician) (born 1931), former member of the Legislative Assembly of Alberta
 Ian Reid (Scottish clergyman), leader of the Iona Community 1967–1974
 Ian Reid (poet), co-founder of Friendly Street Poets in Adelaide, 1975
 Ian Reid (footballer) (born 1951), Scottish footballer (Queen of the South)
 Ian Reid (Newfoundland and Labrador politician) (born 1952), former member of the Parliament of Canada
 Ian Reid (manager) (fl. 1970s), original manager of XTC
 Ian Reid (endocrinologist), 2015 recipient of the Rutherford Medal

See also
 Ian Read (born 1953), CEO of Pfizer
 Ian Read (musician), English neofolk and traditional folk musician
 Ian Reed (born 1927), discus thrower
 Iain Reid, Canadian novelist